NottinghamWorld is an online news publisher based in the United Kingdom, aimed at people in Nottingham and the East Midlands.

Launched March 2023, NottinghamWorld is part of a portfolio of UK news websites launched by National World plc.

Background 
Following the acquisition of JPIMedia Publishing by National World Plc in January 2021, the company began expanding its footprint into several major metropolitan areas in the UK. Caroline Barry, former Nottingham Post journalist at Reach plc, was appointed as Editor for NottinghamWorld.

Content 
NottinghamWorld follows the objectives of its sister titles, all under the NationalWorld editorial ethos and aims to “build unique partnerships which reflect the ambition of National World and our desire to bring better local news and sport to more cities and people.”

References